A number of steamships have carried the name Artemis, including -

, a Greek cargo ship that sank in 1932

See also
 for motor vessels named Artemis

Ship names